Julia or Julie Smith may refer to:

Actresses
Julie Anne Smith (born 1960), birth name of American Oscar winner Julianne Moore
Julie K. Smith (born 1967), American adult film actress
Julie Smith (actress), British actress during 1990s and 2000s, a/k/a Julia Lee Smith

Sportswomen
Julie Smith (softball) (born 1968), American Olympian
Julie Smith (athlete) (born 1982), Australian Paralympian

Writers
Julia Evelina Smith (1792–1886), American women's suffrage activist and author
Julia Holmes Smith (1839–1930), American physician, writer and publisher
Julia Smith (composer) (1905–1989), American composer, pianist and writer on music
Julia Smith (producer) (1927–1997), English television director, writer and producer
Julie Smith (novelist) (born 1944), American mystery writer
Julia M. H. Smith (born 1956), English professor of medieval history
Julie Smith, Baroness Smith of Newnham (born 1969), English politician and lecturer at Cambridge

Others
Julia Murdock Smith (1831–1880), American member of Latter Day Saint movement
Julie Smith (Miss Alabama) (born 1975/76), American beauty pageant winner
Julianne "Julie" Smith, American foreign policy advisor and diplomat to NATO in 2021
Julia Smith, a figure in the 1872 Kelsey Outrage

Characters
Juley Smith, portrayed by Joseph Kpobie on EastEnders from 2002 to 2006